The Highest Mountain is an album by saxophonist Clifford Jordan which was recorded in West Germany in 1975 and first released on the SteepleChase label. The album should not be confused with the CD reissue of the Muse album Night of the Mark VII which also used the same title.

Track listing 
All compositions by Clifford Jordan except as indicated
 "Bearcat" - 6:46  
 "Seven Minds" (Sam Jones) – 9:28  
 "Impressions of Scandinavia" – 4:48  
 "Scorpio" [alternate take] (Jones) – 3:45 Bonus track on CD reissue 
 "Firm Roots" [alternate take] (Cedar Walton) – 6:36 Bonus track on CD reissue
 "The House on Maple Street" (Walton) – 7:35  
 "Miss Morgan" (Jones) – 5:55  
 "The Highest Mountain" – 9:18

Personnel 
Clifford Jordan – tenor saxophone; flute on "Miss Morgan"
Cedar Walton – piano
Sam Jones – bass
Billy Higgins – drums

References 

Clifford Jordan albums
1975 albums
SteepleChase Records albums